Sebastiania chaetodonta is a species of flowering plant in the family Euphorbiaceae. It was described in 1874. It is native to Minas Gerais, Brazil.

References

Plants described in 1874
Flora of Brazil
chaetodonta
Taxa named by Johannes Müller Argoviensis